Ozy and Millie is a daily comic strip that ran from 1998 to 2008, created by Dana Simpson (originally published under D.C. Simpson). It follows the adventures of assorted anthropomorphized animals, centering on Ozy and Millie, two young foxes attending North Harbordale Elementary School in Seattle, contending with everyday elementary school issues such as tests and bullies, as well as more surreal situations.

The strip concentrates on character interaction, but sometimes veers into commentary based on author Simpson's own political views.

Publication history 
Ozy and Millie originally started as a print comic strip in a Washington college newspaper, the Copper Point Journal, in 1997, with Simpson using ink and brush as drawing implements. When the strip began, Simpson's artistic style was similar to that in Calvin and Hobbes—Simpson claims to have been influenced by comics and cartoons such as Bloom County, Calvin and Hobbes, The Simpsons, and Pogo.

It became an irregular webcomic in early 1998. In June 1998, it became a Monday-Friday daily strip. In the same year, Simpson won a newspaper syndicate's college cartoonist award.

In 2000, the strip went on hiatus and returned with a new, unique style. The strip also went on hiatus several times. It was once on hiatus for five months, between August 23, 2003, and January 22, 2004. Between January 30, 2004, and January 12, 2009, Simpson also ran another strip, I Drew This, a webcomic specifically about her political views (which are also expressed in Ozy and Millie).

The comic was part of Keenspot from 2001 to 2003, going independent for several years before returning to Keenspot in November 2006. New strips were released on most weekdays, though the strip's run ended in 2008. Since then, it has been re-run intermittently on GoComics.

Editorial cartoonist Ted Rall included six pages of interview illustrated with Ozy and Millie strips in Attitude 3: The New Subversive Online Cartoonists.

Collected editions
Most of the strips have been reprinted in book form. There is:

An incomplete five volume collection from Plan Nine Publishing, now out of print.
A complete seven volume collection from Lulu.com, in paperback, that replaces the discontinued Plan Nine collection. It covers the entire run of the strip from 1997 to 2008.
A complete two volume collection from Lulu.com, in paperback and hardcover: an alternative to the seven volume collection that also covers the entire run of the strip.
A best-of book from Andrews McMeel Publishing, in paperback and hardcover, with strips in full color for the first time.

‡ This book appears to have been published with the same ISBN as another (a publication error).

Characters

Ozy
Ozymandias Justin Llewellyn is a ten-year-old anthropomorphic fox of an unidentified species (also called an "Adolescent Gray Zen Fox") who attends North Harbordale Elementary School in Seattle, together with his friend Millie. He was originally supposed to be a wolf, until a fan showed Simpson a photo of Arctic fox cubs, that Simpson claimed were "absolute ringers" for Ozy. However, Ozy retained his whisker marks. Ozy's full name, Ozymandias Justin Llewellyn, is a reference to the poem Ozymandias by Percy Bysshe Shelley.

Ozy is recognised by his large top hat, which he got from his father Llewellyn when he adopted Ozy. The only other clothing he wears is a vest, which makes him the target of some of Millie's practical jokes. He is adept at letting Millie's pranks pass by without effect, but he does suffer bullying at the hands of the school jock, Jeremy, who likes to stuff Ozy into trash cans. Ozy also suffers from annual baldness, usually through either a freak accident or because of Millie. Although it is caused by a gypsy curse (later revealed by Llewellyn to be a myth) which has passed on through Ozy's adoptive father's heritage largely unnoticed, it does affect Ozy badly since he is the first Llewellyn with any hair to lose. Ozy is also quiet and serene, usually playing the "straight person". Under Llewellyn's guidance, Ozy also practices Zen; or rather a humorous version of it.

Ozy is told by Llewellyn that his birth mother's name was Shelley and that she disappeared after discovering perfection when she created the "perfect" ice cream flavor, but since absolute perfection is incompatible with the world, she ascended to a higher plane of existence (Noting that Llewellyn also told him she was an ice cream machine).

Ozy's father left before he was born and became a monk. The pair met when the monk came to town for a visit, though Ozy decided to stay with Llewellyn, whom he considered his "true" dad.

Millie
Millicent Mehitabel Mudd, better known as Millie, is a ten-year-old red fox girl who is Ozy's best friend. Millie is usually seen wearing a set of blue denim overalls. Unlike Ozy, who is calm, Millie is chaotic and manic, both in the destruction she leaves behind and the ways she devises of avoiding work. She is a rebel and is opposed to any form of authority, which regularly leads to confrontations with both her teacher, Ms. Sorkowitz, and her mother, Mililani Mudd. Her destructive and rebellious habits not only get herself into trouble, but Ozy too.
Her most infamous antic was giving Ozy a haircut only to accidentally shave off all his fur. Although she is normally manic, she also has a strong sense of justice, facing the inexplicable wrongs of life and the world she sees. However, her rebellions are mostly limited to annoying her mother, playing jokes on Ozy and disrupting the peace at school. None of which matters any less to her, as long as she has fun doing it. Millie says aloud what others think, and does what others, for fear of reaction from the people around them, would not dare. She, like Ozy, often tries to answer the most important questions in life, but her method of finding the answers makes her unique.

Llewellyn
Ozy's adoptive father, known only as Llewellyn, is a red dragon. Llewellyn and other members of his dragon family have been responsible for running several secret conspiracies. He also lends both Ozy and Millie advice, although his advice tends to be nonsense. He has also tried to run for U.S. president—first under the "Rainbow Peace Party" in 1968, the "People With Nothing Better To Do" Party in 2000, then under the "Zen Party" in 2004 and 2008. He also runs his house as a separate nation: Greater Llewellynlland. His favourite pastime is playing the "House Rules Parcheesi", a game which has many, very complicated rules, that is claimed to be rather opposite to Calvinball. Llewellyn married Millie's Mother at the end of the Daily Strip. Of all the characters in Ozy and Millie, Simpson has claimed that Llewellyn is her favorite.

Ms. Mudd
Ms. Mililani Minerva Mudd, Millie's mother, is a lawyer, who is as an older, wiser, more temperate version of Millie. She was like Millie in her childhood, and as a result knows how to deal with any trouble caused by her, much to Millie's annoyance. While Ms. Mudd knows how to deal with Millie, she is also the first to lend her support if there is anything amiss. She married Llewellyn at the end of the strip's run in a storyarc from November–December 2008. Her full name was revealed on October 1, 2008.

Other characters
Other characters in Ozy and Millie include Avery, a raccoon friend who constantly tries to be "cool," even ditching his "uncool" friends such as Ozy. Ironically, his friend Stephan the aardvark is the nerdiest character in the strip. Avery's younger brother, Timulty, constantly undermines his coolness. The two major antagonists are Felicia the sheep, a "popular girl" who teases Millie for being too individualistic, and Jeremy the jock rabbit who bullies Ozy.

Other minor characters include Ms. Sorkowitz, Ozy and Millie's kangaroo teacher and Principal Beau Vine, the bull principal of the school who allows bullying believing that, "Repeated exposure to unprovoked assault squelches unhealthy nonconformist tendencies." Dr. I. Wahnsinnig (German for insane or mad), is a ring-tailed lemur psychiatrist of the school who fights with Vine over school issues. Ozy's dragon cousin Isolde is another character who, like Llewellyn, is in charge of various conspiracies. Another character is Pirate Captain Locke, a child pirate from an alternate dimension on the other side of Llewellyn's couch, in which people age backwards. Locke, currently the same age as Millie, is also her biological father.

Reception
Critic Fred Patten is one of the main supporters of the strip. In 2001, he wrote that the strip was, "a gently humorous fantasy with a liberal political philosophy." In 2006, Patten still claimed that, "Ozy and Millie is one of the top anthropomorphic cartoon strips on the Internet," although he did also comment negatively about the loss of colour in between changes of printed editions of books. The comic is also popular because of its relatively inoffensive content, with one person writing that it was, "Suitable for readers of all ages, really."

In 2002, the strip won the Web Cartoonist's Choice Awards for "Best Anthropomorphic Comic". Ozy and Millie also won the 2006 and 2007 Ursa Major Awards for "Best Anthropomorphic Comic Strip".

See also

 Phoebe and Her Unicorn (a/k/a Heavenly Nostrils)

References

External links
Official site of Ozy and Millie
Define "Cynical" – Fan site and discussion board

American comedy webcomics
Keenspot
Anthropomorphic foxes
1990s webcomics
2000s webcomics
1998 webcomic debuts
2008 webcomic endings
Comics characters introduced in 1997
Comic strip duos
Webcomics in print
Furry webcomics
Web Cartoonists' Choice Award winners
Comics about foxes